Dorsal artery may refer to:

 Dorsal artery of clitoris
 Dorsal artery of the penis
 Dorsal digital arteries of hand
 Dorsal digital arteries of foot
 Dorsal interosseous artery also known as posterior interosseous artery
 Dorsal metacarpal arteries
 Dorsal metatarsal arteries
 Dorsal nasal artery
 Dorsal pancreatic artery
 Dorsal scapular artery
 Dorsal spinal artery also known as posterior spinal artery
 Dorsalis pedis artery
 First dorsal metatarsal artery